Jeanne Sully (15 April 1905 - 28 June 1995) (born Jeanne Régine Champs) was a French actress.

Biography

Jeanne Marie Régine Simone Champs was born in Paris on 15 April 1905.
Her parents were the actors Jeanne Rémy and Jean Mounet-Sully, and her uncle was the actor Paul Mounet.
She attended the Conservatoire national supérieur d'art dramatique in Paris, where she was a pupil of Raphaël Duflos.
In 1924 she obtained a second prize for comedy, and in 1925 won a first prize in tragedy. 
She made her debut in 1925 at the Comédie-Française in Jean Racine's play Britannicus, in the role of Junie.
She played in many stage roles, and in some films.

She became the 394th member of the Comédie-Française in 1934.
She retired in 1946, but continued to make tours or give lectures both in France and abroad.
She died in Meaux, Seine-et-Marne, on 28 June 1995 at the home for actors at Couilly-Pont-aux-Dames, Seine-et-Marne.

Theater

Her theater roles included:

Filmography

References

External links

 

 

1905 births
1995 deaths
French stage actresses
French film actresses
Troupe of the Comédie-Française
Actresses from Paris
French National Academy of Dramatic Arts alumni
20th-century French actresses